Ooperipatus oviparus is a species of velvet worm in the Peripatopsidae family. Females of this species range from 4 mm to 60 mm in length, whereas males range from 4 mm to 20 mm. This species lays eggs and has 15 pairs of legs with claws. It is found in Victoria, Australia.

References

Onychophorans of Australasia
Onychophoran species
Animals described in 1895
Taxa named by Arthur Dendy